is a railway station on the Hanawa Line in the city of Hachimantai, Iwate Prefecture, Japan, operated by East Japan Railway Company (JR East).

Lines

Station layout
Akasakata Station has one ground-level side platform serving a single bi-directional track. The station is unattended.

History
Akasakata Station opened on November 10, 1926, serving the village of Arasawa. The station was absorbed into the JR East network upon the privatization of JNR on April 1, 1987.

Surrounding area
National Route 282

See also
 List of Railway Stations in Japan

References

External links

  

Hanawa Line
Railway stations in Japan opened in 1926
Railway stations in Iwate Prefecture
Stations of East Japan Railway Company
Hachimantai, Iwate